Association Sportive et Culturelle Le Geldar is a football club of French Guiana, playing in the town of Kourou. They play in the French Guianese first division, the French Guiana Championnat National.

Achievements
French Guiana Championnat National: 10
 1985, 1988, 1989, 2001, 2004, 2005, 2008, 2009, 2010, 2013

Outremer Champions Cup: 1
 2005

Coupe D.O.M: 1
 2005

Coupe de Guyane: 4
 1978–79, 2006–07, 2008–09, 2009–10

Coupe de la Municipalité de Kourou: 1
 1982/83

Coupe des Guyanes: 1
 2008

Performance in CONCACAF competitions
CONCACAF Champions' Cup: 1 appearance
1992 – 1st Round (Caribbean) – Lost against  SV Robinhood 2 – 1 on aggregate (stage 2 of 6)

The club in the French football structure
French Cup: 7 appearances
 1983–84, 1988–89, 2002–03, 2010–2011, 2012–13, 2016–17, 2017–18
{| class="wikitable" style="text-align: center"
|+ Ties won
! Year !! Round !! Home team (tier) !! Score !! Away team (tier)
|-
| 1988–89 || Round 8 || ASC Le Geldar || 1–1   || EAC Chaumont (3)
|-
| 1988–89 || Round 9 || FC Sens (5) || 1–2 || ASC Le Geldar
|}

Presidents
 Eustase Rimane (1957–60)
 Etienne Antoinette (1960–76)
 Gabriel Deloumeau (1976–80)
 Firmin Zulemaro (1980–81)
 Daniel Talmensy (1981–83)
 Jacques Voyer (1983–86)
 Eutase Rimane (1986–89)
 Daniel Thalmensy (1989–)

References
Official Website

Football clubs in French Guiana
Association football clubs established in 1957
1957 establishments in French Guiana